Bottema's theorem is a theorem in plane geometry by the Dutch mathematician Oene Bottema (Groningen, 1901–1992).

The theorem is true when the squares are constructed in one of the following ways:

Looking at the figure, starting from the lower left vertex, follow the triangle vertices clockwise and construct the squares to the left of the sides of the triangle.
Follow the triangle in the same way and construct the squares to the right of the sides of the triangle.

If the squares are replaced by regular polygons of the same type, then a generalized Bottema theorem is obtained: 
 

See also 
 Van Aubel's theorem
 Napoleon's theorem

References

External links
 Bottema's Theorem: What Is It?
 Wolfram Demonstrations Project – Bottema's Theorem
 GeoGebra Demonstrations Project - A Generalized Theorem - Equilateral Triangles
 GeoGebra Demonstrations Project - A Generalized Theorem - Regular Pentagons

Theorems about triangles